Reentrant or re-entrant can refer to:

Re-entrant (landform), the low ground formed between two hill spurs.
Reentrancy (computing) in computer programming
Reentrant mutex in computer science
Reentry (neural circuitry) in neuroscience
Salients, re-entrants and pockets in military tactics
Reentrant tuning in music
Concave polygon, AKA reentrant polygon

See also
 Reentry
 Reentrant dysrhythmia, a type of cardiac arrhythmia